Ibi is a town and administrative district in Taraba State, Nigeria. The town is located on the south bank of the Benue River, opposite the influx of the much smaller Shemankar River. Both the Taraba River and the Donga River flow into the Benue within the LGA.

Ibi is one of the sixteen local government areas of Taraba State, and is governed by an elected chairman.

History
Ibi is located where the traditional land trade route of eastern Igboland crossed the river trade route of the Benue River. it is home to the Jukun people who are predominantly Farmers and fishermen (especially those along the river bank) (up river). . 
By 1899 the Niger Company established a trading station at Ibi, and by 1901 telegraph service to  Lokoja had been established.  The British took control in 1900 and established Ibi as the administrative headquarters of western Muri. As cotton was one of the major crops of the area, steam powered cotton gins were established in Ibi in the early 1920s.

Climate

Notes

Local Government Areas in Taraba State
Benue River